MAZ-200 was a Soviet truck manufactured at the Minsk Automobile Plant. It was the first Soviet truck powered by a diesel engine. The MAZ-200 was initially produced by YaAZ (Yaroslavl Automobile Plant) between 1947 and 1950, after which the production was moved to MAZ.

In 1962, it was re-engined with the YaMZ-236 V6 diesel.

Variants
MAZ-200: Standard production version.
MAZ-200D: Cab-chassis version.
MAZ-200G: Troop transport version. Produced 1951-1958.
MAZ-200P: As MAZ-200 except equipped with the YaMZ-236 engine.
MAZ-200V: Tractor-trailer version. Produced 1952-1966.
MAZ-200M: As MAZ-200V except equipped with the YaMZ-236 engine.
MAZ-200R: MAZ-200V with hydraulic systems to control tipper trailers.
MAZ-205: Dump truck version. Produced 1947-1965.
MAZ-501: Logging truck version. Produced 1955-1965.
MAZ-501B: MAZ-501 equipped with the YaMZ-236 engine.
MAZ-501V: Tractor-trailer version of MAZ-501.
MAZ-502: Four-wheel-drive version. Produced 1957-1965.
MAZ-502V: Tractor-trailer version of MAZ-502.
NAMI-020: Prototype 6×6 modification of MAZ-200. Later built as Ural-375.
NAMI-021: Prototype 6×6 modification of MAZ-200. Later built as Ural-375H.

External links

Trucks of the Soviet Union
200